Kazakhstan competed at the World Games 2017 in Wroclaw, Poland, from 20 July 2017 to 30 July 2017.

Competitors

Gymnastic

Rhythmic Gymnastics
Kazakhstan has qualified at the 2017 World Games:

 Women's individual event - 2 quota

Trampoline
Kazakhstan has qualified at the 2017 World Games:

Men's Individual Tumbling - 1 quota

Karate

Kazakhstan has qualified at the 2017 World Games:

Men's Individual Kumite -67kg- 1 quota (Rinat Sagandykov)
Men's Individual Kumite -75kg- 1 quota (Yermek Ainazarov)

Kickboxing
Kazakhstan has qualified at the 2017 World Games:

Men's -91kg – 1 quota (Askat Zhantursynov)
Men's +91kg – 1 quota (Yersultan Bekenov)
Women's -60kg – 1 quota (Shara Khamzina)

References 

Nations at the 2017 World Games
2017 in Kazakhstani sport
2017